2012 BNP Paribas Open – Women's doubles was a professional tennis tournament played at Indian Wells, California.

Liezel Huber and Lisa Raymond defeated the defending champions Sania Mirza and Elena Vesnina 6–2, 6–3 in the final.

Seeds

Draw

Finals

Top half

Bottom half

References
Main Draw

BNP Paribas Open - Women's Doubles
2012 BNP Paribas Open